John Abbamondi is the chief executive officer of the Brooklyn Nets, Barclays Center, the Long Island Nets, and  the Nets Gaming Crew of the NBA 2K League. Abbamondi also serves as alternate governor for the Brooklyn Nets.

Abbamondi is a two-time recipient of the Navy Air Medal with veteran experience including 40 combat missions across Iraq.

Early life and career 
Abbamondi grew up in Choctaw, Oklahoma. Abbamondi graduated from MIT with B.S. degree in political science in 1993. While attending MIT, Abbamondi was class president and a member of the Naval Reserve Officers Training Corps. Abbamondi also received an MBA from Stanford Graduate School of Business in 2004.

Prior to joining Joseph Tsai's BSE Global, Abbamondi worked for the US Navy (1993–2002) as lieutenant/naval flight officer, Major League Baseball (2004–07) under Bud Selig as senior director of labor economics, St. Louis Cardinals (2007–10) as assistant general manager, San Diego Padres as VP of strategy & business analysis, National Basketball Association as SVP of team marketing & business operations (2013–16) in NYC, and Madison Square Garden Entertainment (2016–20) as EVP of ticketing/suites/hospitality. Abbamondi is a former board member (2011–12) for the USO San Diego.

During his time with the MLB, Abbamondi helped negotiate the Basic Agreement (2006-2011) with the MLB Players Association, and played a pivotal role in the restructuring of the MLB's revenue-sharing system. Additionally, Abbamondi was a member of the Revenue Sharing Definitions Committee, with a focus on the valuation of broadcast rights fee agreements. Also, Abbamondi participated in collective bargaining discussions regarding MLB/union economic initiatives with the Players Association and the Umpires Association.

Brooklyn Nets 
On July 28, 2020, Abbamondi was named CEO of BSE Global, the parent company of the Brooklyn Nets, Barclays Center, the Long Island Nets, and the NetsGC. Abbamondi would replace Oliver Weisberg, who acted as interim CEO during the previous year.

Abbamondi said, “I am thrilled and honored to be joining BSE Global and working with our ownership. New York has been my home for much of my adult life, and I know first-hand the passion New Yorkers have for their sports teams. It is the honor of a lifetime to have the opportunity to lead the Nets franchise, Barclays Center and BSE Global’s other properties into this exciting new chapter of their history.”

On November 30, 2020, Abbamondi hired five new senior executives:  Emerson Moore as EVP/CPO of BSE Global, Peter Stern as EVP/CFO of BSE Global, Jackie Wilson II as executive director of diversity & inclusion of BSE Global, Adina Erwin as GM of Barclays Center, and Chris Giacalone as VP of hospitality of Barclays Center.

See also 
List of National Basketball Association team presidents

References

Living people
National Basketball Association executives
Year of birth missing (living people)